Machu Apachita (Quechua machu old, old person, Aymara apachita the place of transit of an important pass in the principal routes of the Andes; name in the Andes for a stone cairn, a little pile of rocks built along the trail in the high mountains, also spelled Machu Apacheta) is a mountain in the Andes of Peru, about  high. It is located in the Cusco Region, Quispicanchi Province, on the border of the districts of Camanti and Marcapata. It is situated southeast of Wisk'achani.

References

Mountains of Cusco Region
Mountains of Peru